Oi! is a subgenre of punk rock that originated in the United Kingdom in the late 1970s. The music and its associated subculture had the goal of bringing together punks, skinheads, and other disaffected working-class youth. The movement was partly a response to the perception that many participants in the early punk rock scene were, in the words of The Business guitarist Steve Kent, "trendy university people using long words, trying to be artistic...and losing touch."

History
Oi! became a recognised genre in the latter part of the 1970s, emerging after the perceived commercialisation of punk rock, and before the soon-to-dominate hardcore punk sound. It fused the sounds of early punk bands such as the Sex Pistols, the Ramones, the Clash, and the Jam with influences from 1960s British rock bands such as the Small Faces and the Who, football chants, pub rock bands such as Dr. Feelgood, Eddie and the Hot Rods and The 101ers, and glam rock bands such as Slade and Sweet. Although Oi! has come to be considered mainly a skinhead-oriented genre, the first few Oi! bands were composed mostly of punk rockers and people who fit neither the skinhead nor punk label.

First-generation Oi! bands such as Sham 69 and Cock Sparrer were around for years before the word Oi! was used retroactively to describe their style of music. In 1980, writing in Sounds magazine, rock journalist Garry Bushell labelled the movement Oi!, taking the name from the garbled "Oi!" that Stinky Turner of Cockney Rejects used to introduce the band's songs. The word is a British expression meaning hey or hey there! In addition to Cockney Rejects, other bands to be explicitly labeled Oi! in the early days of the genre included Angelic Upstarts, the 4-Skins, the Business, Anti-Establishment, Blitz, the Blood and Combat 84.

The prevalent ideology of the original Oi! movement was a rough brand of working-class rebellion. Lyrical topics included unemployment, workers' rights, harassment by police and other authorities, and oppression by the government. Oi! songs also covered less-political topics such as street violence, football, sex, and alcohol.

Some fans of Oi! were involved in white nationalist organisations such as the National Front (NF) and the British Movement (BM), leading some critics to dismiss the Oi! subgenre as racist. However, none of the bands associated with the original Oi! scene promoted racism or far-right politics. Some Oi! bands, such as Angelic Upstarts, The Business, The Burial and The Oppressed were associated with left wing politics and anti-racism, and others were non-political.

Rock Against Communism (RAC) was a partial development from white power/white supremacist movements, which had musical and aesthetic similarities to Oi! Although due to Cold War fears the genre had appeal to some punk rock bands distinct from original Oi! in that they opposed all totalitarianism, but was not connected to the Oi! scene. Timothy S. Brown writes:

Garry Bushell, the journalist who promoted the Oi! genre, argued that the white power music scene was "totally distinct from us. We had no overlap other than a mutual dislike".

The mainstream media increased its claims that Oi! was linked to far-right racist politics after an Oi! concert at the Hambrough Tavern in Southall on 4 July 1981 ended with five hours of rioting, 120 people being injured and the tavern being burnt down. Before the concert, some audience members had written NF slogans around the area and bullied Asian residents of the neighbourhood. In response, local Asian youths threw Molotov cocktails and other objects at the tavern, mistakenly believing that the concert—featuring the Business, the 4-Skins and the Last Resort—was a neo-Nazi event. Although some of the concert-goers were National Front or British Movement supporters, none of the performers were white power music bands, and the audience of approximately 500 people included skinheads, black skinheads, punk rockers, rockabillies, and non-affiliated youths.

In the aftermath of that riot, many Oi! bands condemned racism and fascism. These denials, however, were met with cynicism from some quarters because of the Strength Thru Oi! compilation album, released in May 1981. Not only was its title a play on a Nazi slogan "Strength Through Joy", but the cover featured Nicky Crane, a skinhead BM activist who was serving a four-year sentence for racist violence (Crane later disavowed his alignment with the far right after revealing he was gay). Bushell, who compiled the album, stated its title was a pun on the Skids' album Strength Through Joy, and that he had been unaware of the Nazi connotations. He also denied knowing the identity of the skinhead on the album's cover until it was exposed by the Daily Mail two months after the release. Bushell, a socialist at the time, noted the irony of being branded a far-right activist by a newspaper that "had once supported Oswald Mosley's Blackshirts, Mussolini's invasion of Abyssinia, and appeasement with Hitler right up to the outbreak of World War Two."

After the Oi! movement lost momentum in the United Kingdom, Oi! scenes formed in continental Europe, North America, and Asia. Soon, especially in the United States, the Oi! phenomenon mirrored the hardcore punk scene of the late 1970s, with American Oi!-originating bands such as the Radicals, U.S. Chaos, Iron Cross, Agnostic Front, Anti Heros. Later American punk bands such as Rancid and Dropkick Murphys have credited Oi! as a source of inspiration. In the mid-1990s, there was a revival of interest in Oi! music, leading to older Oi! bands receiving more recognition in the UK and bands such as The Business being discovered by young, multiracial skinheads in the US. In the 2000s, many of the original UK Oi! bands reunited to perform and/or record.

List of Oi! bands 

The 4-Skins
The Adicts
The Angelic Upstarts
The Anti-Heros
The Blaggers
Blitz
The Blood
Böhse Onkelz (early)
The Burial
The Business
Close Shave
Cobra
Cock Sparrer
Cockney Rejects
Combat 84
Condemned 84
Darkbuster
The Discocks
Dropkick Murphys (early)
Direktori
Eastern Youth (early)
The Ejected
The Exploited (early)
Flatfoot 56
Garotos Podres
Hard Skin
Hardsell
Infa Riot
Iron Cross
Klasse Kriminale
Last Resort
Lower Class Brats
Major Accident
Mr Floppy
Oi Polloi
Opció K-95
The Oppressed
Orlík
Oxymoron
The Partisans
Perkele
Peter and the Test Tube Babies
The Press
Red Alert
The Ruts
SA (Samurai Attack)
Sham 69
Skrewdriver (early)
Slaughter and the Dogs
Sledgeback
Splodgenessabounds
Street Dogs
The Strike
The Templars
Those Unknown
Toy Dolls
UK Subs
U.S. Chaos
The Warriors
Ritam Nereda

See also
 Street punk
 Skinhead

References

External links
oioimusic.com Weekly updated site with interviews and reviews
Europe Punk - Music for social change, not profit.
Punk and Oi! in the UK includes interviews and news about Oi! bands
Oi! the Web Site includes information about the original Oi! compilation albums

 
Punk rock genres
Skinhead
Welsh styles of music
1970s in music
Scottish styles of music
1980s in music
20th-century music genres
English styles of music
Working-class culture in the United Kingdom
British rock music genres